is a Japanese voice actor and singer affiliated with 81 Produce. At the 2nd Seiyu Awards in 2008, Hatano won the Best Male Rookie Award for his roles as Sam Houston in Toward the Terra and Tenshi Yuri in Saint Beast: Kouin Jojishi Tenshitan. Other major roles voiced include Haruta Shigemo in Jujutsu Kaisen, Gajeel Redfox in Fairy Tail, Metal Bat in One Punch Man and Yūto Ayase in Nogizaka Haruka no Himitsu.  In video games, he voices Josuke Higashikata in the CyberConnect2 developed JoJo's Bizarre Adventure games, and Rufus in the Street Fighter franchise. On April 2, 2018, he announced his marriage with fellow voice actress Mai Hashimoto.

Career
After passing the summer audition held by Amuse, he attended the Voice Actor Talent Department of Amusement Media Academy as a special student, and later became a member of 81 after attending the 81 Produce Acting Institute (a training school directly under 81).

After playing the role of an announcer in an original drama CD by Takehito Koyasu (while still at the vocational school), he made his debut in 2001 in the TV drama version of Timecop (same as above). In the same year, he made his TV anime debut with "Yobarete Tobidete! Akubi-chan" (same as above).

In 2008, he won the 2nd Seiyu Awards for New Actor.

On December 21, 2011, he made his debut as a singer under his own name with the single "Hajimari no Hi ni".

Filmography

Anime

Film

Video games

Drama CDs

Other dubbing

Character Song

Discography

Singles

Albums

References

External links
 Official agency profile 
 
 

1982 births
Living people
Male voice actors from Nagano Prefecture
Japanese male video game actors
Japanese male voice actors
Japanese male pop singers
Seiyu Award winners
Anime singers
21st-century Japanese singers
21st-century Japanese male singers
81 Produce voice actors